The Tottenham Hotspur Academy is the youth system of Tottenham Hotspur Football Club. The academy was created to train and develop players from the age of eight all the way through to the age of 23.  Many of those who have progressed through Tottenham's academy have gone on to sign professional contracts and several have represented their country at full international level.

The reserves in recent times have been known as the Development Squad to reflect the purpose of producing players for the first team. Though matches are billed as under 21, three overage players are allowed which gives the club the opportunity to give senior squad players a chance to play and keep or build up match fitness, often following an injury.

They have won one Premier Reserve League South title since the league's formation in 1999 and were runners-up in the inaugural Barclays U21 Premiership League which took over from 2012.

Historical reserve team
Prior to the formation of the academy, the reserve team played in the Football Combination. This was founded as the London Combination and originally consisted of London-based first teams, with reserve teams taking over in 1919. From 1926, clubs outside of London were admitted and the name of the league changed to the Football Combination. Tottenham's reserves were winners in seasons 1919–20, 1921–22, 1925–26, 1952–53, 1955–56, 1956–57, 1961–62, 1963–64, 1965–66, 1966–67, 1967–68, 1970–71, 1971–72, 1978–79, 1979–80, 1986–87, 1987–88, 1988–89 and 1994–95.

In 1999 the FA Premier Reserve League was founded and Tottenham's reserve team moved to that competition, remaining until the end of the 2008–09 season. Tottenham reserves won the FA Premier Reserve League, southern division, in season 2005–06.

Historical youth team
In 1923, Tottenham entered into an arrangement which saw Tottenham youngsters turn out for Northfleet United in the Kent League and associated cup competitions. Northfleet were Kent League Cup winners in 1923–24, and Kent League Division 1 champions in 1925–26, during which they scored 172 goals in a 36 match season. They won the Kent Senior Cup for five successive seasons between 1923–24 and 1927–28.

Northfleet United joined the Southern League Eastern Section in 1927–28 but left in 1930 and rejoined the Kent League. In 1931, the arrangement between the clubs was upgraded to full nursery team status and this heralded a period during which they scored a minimum of 110 goals in league competition each season. Northfleet were Kent League Division 1 Championship and Kent League Cup double winners in 1931–32 and 1934–35, league champions in 1935–36, and double winners again in 1936–37 (completing a hat-trick as league champions). They were Kent Senior Cup winners in 1937–38, and Kent League Division 1 champions again in 1938–39.

With the outbreak of the Second World War, league competition ceased as did the nursery team arrangement.

Tottenham Hotspur's youth team, for players aged 18 and under and known as Tottenham's 'A' team, was entered into the Eastern Counties League in 1948. They won the League Cup in their first season and the league title and the East Anglian Cup in their second. In 1957–58 they again won both the league and East Anglian Cup and went on to win the League Cup the following season. They won three consecutive league titles in 1959–60, 1960–61 and 1961–62. During their time in the Eastern Counties League the team played at White Hart Lane, as well as at Hoddesdon Town's Lowfield Ground (1950–51), the Hoddesdon Sports Arena (1951–52) and Brookfields Lane in Cheshunt (1952–1963).

In 1963 they moved to the Metropolitan League, winning the League Cup in 1963–64, the League Cup and Professional Cup in 1964–65 and the league itself in 1966–67.

In 1969 the youth team moved to the South East Counties League, winning it in seasons 1969–70, 1970–71, 1972–73, 1978–79, 1980–81, the five seasons 1985–86 through to 1989–90, 1991–92, 1992–93 and 1994–95. The youth team also won the national FA Youth Cup in 1970, 1974 and 1990.  The team first won the South East Counties League Cup in 1985 and followed this with victories in 1986, 1988, 1991 (jointly), 1992, 1993, 1996 and 1997.

The youth team's reserves, otherwise known as the juniors or colts and consisting primarily of younger players, also took part in the South East Counties League. The league was originally split into Senior League and Junior League but from season 1985–86 it was Division One for the youth team and Division Two for the juniors.

The FA Premier Youth League was formed in 1997 and expanded in 1998 to be renamed the FA Premier Academy League, and the youth team left the South East Counties League.

The Academy
The Tottenham Hotspur Academy coaches young footballers from the ages of 8 to 18 involving approximately 150 young players, looked after by 30 full-time and part-time staff. The academy features a network of 35 scouts who are tasked with finding the best local, national and international talent. Whilst under 16, in the Youth development phase, players are coached or play in the evenings and the weekend whilst they are in full-time education. On reaching 16, the best players are offered a place in the U18s Academy on a full-time 2 year Scholarship contract. This provides an academic programme alongside their football commitments. Players will usually progress through first and second years of the professional development phase whereupon on completion, they will be either offered a professional contract or be released. Where a player is borderline or has been held back because of injury there is the option of offering a third year at the academy by exception.

Notable players to come through the Tottenham Hotspur Academy include Harry Kane, Ledley King, Jake Livermore, Ryan Mason, Danny Rose, Andros Townsend, Kyle Walker-Peters and Harry Winks, all of whom have gone on to represent their country at international level.

In 2017 the newly retired and former Tottenham player Scott Parker was appointed in charge of the Under-18s. In July 2018, Parker left Tottenham to return to his last club, Fulham, serving as first-team coach. The current Under-18 manager is Stuart Lewis, who was appointed in July 2021 to replace Matt Taylor, who had been in place since 2019.

The current Academy Manager is Dean Rastrick, who stepped up from Academy Performance Manager in 2020. Rastrick succeeded John McDermott after the latter left to become the Football Association's assistant, then only months later new, technical director. McDermott had been working at Tottenham's academy for 15 years.

Development squad
Players who have progressed through the academy and have shown the potential to play at a higher level are offered professional contracts and will then join the Development Squad, the successor to the reserve team. The Development Squad may also be joined by Under-21 players signed from other clubs or free agents who have proved themselves in trials at the club. The purpose of the Development Squad is to produce new players for the First Team though breaking into the senior squad is no easy feat for a young player. As well as playing in Under-21 games players may be loaned out to other clubs in lower leagues or sometimes clubs abroad to give them experience and to aid their development.

Clive Allen became the manager of the reserve team at the beginning of the 2005–06 season. Home games at that time were played at Broadhall Way, the home ground of Stevenage Borough. From the 2007–08 season home matches were played at Leyton Orient's home ground, the Matchroom Stadium. The club announced on 12 June 2009 that for the 2009–10 season it would not be entering a team in the Reserve League. Instead the reserve players would be loaned out for first team experience, and if necessary friendly matches would be arranged as required during the season to test out players returning from injury.

After not participating in the Reserve League for three seasons the club agreed to play in the newly formed Barclays U21 Premiership League from season 2012–13.

In July 2014, former Aston Villa and Middlesbrough defender Ugo Ehiogu was appointed Under-21 Team Coach following a period of part-time work within the academy. On 20 April 2017, Ehiogu went into cardiac arrest after collapsing at Tottenham's training ground and died the following day at the age of 44. Two months later, Tottenham announced that they had appointed former Dagenham and Redbridge manager Wayne Burnett as Ehiogu's successor. Burnett currently has the title of Under-23 manager.

Notable seasons

2005–06 season
New manager Clive Allen led the reserve team to their first FA Premier Reserve League South title, staying in 1st position from mid-December until the end of the season. They lost just three times during the league season. In the Barclays Premiership Reserve League Play-Off, contested by the winners of the Southern and Northern Reserve League titles, Tottenham Reserves lost 2–0 to Manchester United Reserves at Old Trafford.

2012–13 season
Tottenham Under-21s won Group 2 of the Barclays U21 Premiership League in the first half of the season which qualified them for the Elite Group, which they also won. This put them through to the end of the season knock-out competition where they progressed all the way to the final, eventually losing 3–2 to Manchester United Under-21s.

Honours

Domestic
 FA Premier Reserve League – South
 Winners (1): 2006
 FA Youth Cup
 Winners (3): 1970, 1974, 1990
 Barclays U21 Premiership League
 Winners Group 2 (1): 2012/13
 Winners Elite Group (1): 2012/13
 Runners-up U21 Premiership League (1): 2012/13

European
 Eurofoot Tournament
 Winners (2): 2007, 2011
 Premier League Champions Cup
 Winners (1): 2014

International
  Lion City Cup
 Winners (1): 2015

Players

Under-21s

Out on loan

Under-18s

Second Year Academy Players

First Year Academy Players

Notable Tottenham Hotspur F.C. youth team players or Academy graduates
The following list of youth team players or Academy graduates appeared in a competitive first team fixture for Tottenham Hotspur and have been capped in a full international since the Second World War. Players still currently playing for the club are in bold. Other still active players are in italcs.

  Eddie Baily
  Nick Barmby
  Nabil Bentaleb
  Mark Bowen
  Noel Brotherston
  Ronnie Burgess
  Sol Campbell
  Stephen Carr
  Cameron Carter-Vickers
  Steven Caulker (also played for England)
  Peter Crouch
  Ted Ditchburn
  Anthony Georgiou
  Phil Gray
  Ron Henry
  Glenn Hoddle
  Mel Hopkins
  Chris Hughton
  Harry Kane
  Stephen Kelly
  Ledley King
  Jake Livermore
  Massimo Luongo
  Ryan Mason
  Chris McGrath
  Paul McVeigh
  Bill Nicholson
  Troy Parrott
  Maksim Paskotši
  Steve Perryman
  Jamie Redknapp
  Stephen Robinson
  Danny Rose
  Graeme Souness
  Andros Townsend
  Miloš Veljković
  Ian Walker
  Kyle Walker-Peters
  Keith Weller
  Harry Winks
  Luke Young

The following list of youth team or Academy players have been capped in a full international since the Second World War but never played in a competitive first team game for Tottenham. Players still currently playing for the club are in bold. Other still active players are in italcs.

  Bobby Almond
  Jordan Archer
  Kallum Cesay
  Sam Cox
  Simon Dawkins
  Kerry Dixon
  Quinton Fortune
  Zaine Francis-Angol
  Warren Hackett
  Mark Hughes
  Oscar Jansson
  Yaser Kasim
  Paul-José M'Poku
  Danny Maddix
  Christian Maghoma
  Jacques Maghoma
  Tomáš Pekhart
  Ramil Sheriff
  Kevin Stewart
  Ciarán Toner
  William Troost-Ekong

The following additional list of youth team players or Academy graduates although uncapped in a full international have appeared in 100 or more competitive fixtures for the Tottenham Hotspur first team since the Second World War. Players still currently playing for the club are in bold. Other still active players are in italcs.

  Phil Beal
  Garry Brooke
  Eddie Clayton
  Stephen Clemence
  Barry Daines
  Ray Evans
  Mark Falco
  Tommy Harmer
  Micky Hazard
  David Howells
  Chris Jones
  Tony Marchi
  Paul Miller
  Jimmy Neighbour
  Keith Osgood
  Jimmy Pearce
  John Pratt
  Vinny Samways
  Frank Saul
  Sonny Walters

Academy management and support staff

Manager history

Reserve team manager / Head of development

The role of Reserve Team Manager was often filled by the club's Assistant Manager.
  Harry Lowe (Reserve Team Manager 1938–1939)
There was no reserve team during World War 2.
  Bill Nicholson (Assistant Manager and coach 1955–1958)
  Harry Evans (Assistant Manager and coach 1959–1962)
  Eddie Baily (Assistant Manager 1963–1974)
  Pat Welton (Reserve team manager 1974–1976)
  Peter Shreeves (Reserve team manager 1977–1980)
  Robin "Robbie" Stepney (Reserve team manager 1980–1984)
  John Pratt (Reserve team manager / Assistant Manager 1984–1986)
  Doug Livermore (Reserve team manager 1986–1991)
  Pat Holland (Reserve team manager 1988(?)–1995)
  Roger Cross (Reserve team manager / Assistant Manager 1995–1997)
  Chris Hughton (Reserve team manager 1997–1998)
  Theo Foley (First team coach / Reserve team manager 1998–2001)
  Colin Calderwood (Reserve team manager 2001–2003)
  Clive Allen (Reserve team manager 2003–2004)
  Clive Allen (Reserve team manager 2005–2009)
There was no reserve team 2009–2012.
 2012–2016 ???
  John McDermott (Head of coaching and development 2016–2020) Note 1
  Wayne Burnett (Under-23 manager 2017–present)
  Dean Rastrick (Academy Manager and Head of operations and performance 2020–present)
  Ryan Mason (Head of player development Under-17 to Under-23 2020–2021)

Note 1McDermott was already Head of coaching and development but it was not until 2016 that he was put in charge of all teams below the first team, and was therefore the notional reserve team manager.

Under-18 manager / Youth team manager

Prior to 1969 Tottenham did not have a full-time youth team manager. Jimmy Anderson was in charge of the Northfleet nursery team from 1934 to 1939 and was arguably the Tottenham youth team manager in all but name.
Sometimes the Under-18 manager is referred to as the Under-18 coach.
  Pat Welton (1969–1974)
  Peter Shreeves (1974–1977)
 1977–1983 ???
  John Pratt (1983–1984)
  Keith Blunt (1984–1987)
  Keith Waldon (1987–1994)
  Des Bulpin (1994–1995)
  Colin Reid (1995–1998)
 1998–2006 ???
  Pat Holland (2001)
  Alex Inglethorpe (2006–2012)
 2012–2015 ???
  Kieran McKenna (2015–2016)
  John McDermott (2016–2017)
  Scott Parker (2017–2018)
  Matt Wells (2018–2019)
  John McDermott (2019)
  Matt Taylor (2019–2021)
  Stuart Lewis (2021–present)

Academy manager / Academy director

The titles 'Academy manager' and 'Academy director' seem to be interchangeable.
  Colin Murphy (1998–1999)
  Peter Suddaby (1999–2005)
  John McDermott (2005–2020)
  Dean Rastrick (2020–present)

References

External links
Official Tottenham Hotspur Under 23 Academy Players
Official Tottenham Hotspur Under 18 Academy Players
 The Tottenham Hotspur academy way – These Football Times (2015)

Reserves
Eastern Counties Football League
Metropolitan League
Football academies in England
Premier League International Cup
UEFA Youth League teams
NextGen series
London League (football)